John Edward Rigby (July 20, 1923 – September 8, 1972) was a Canadian politician. He served in the Legislative Assembly of New Brunswick from 1967 to 1972 as member of the Progressive Conservative party.

References

1923 births
1972 deaths